The 2020–21 1. FC Nürnberg season was the club's 121st season in existence and the club's 2nd consecutive season in the second flight of German football. In addition to the domestic league, 1. FC Nürnberg participated in this season's edition of the DFB-Pokal. The season covers the period from 12 July 2020 to 30 June 2021.

Players

Current squad

Out on loan

Pre-season and friendlies

Competitions

Overview

2. Bundesliga

League table

Results summary

Results by round

Matches

DFB-Pokal

Notes

References

External links

1. FC Nürnberg seasons
Nürnberg